Danico Philmon (born 20 September 1986) is a South African former cricketer. He played in nine first-class and six List A matches for Boland from 2012 to 2019.

See also
 List of Boland representative cricketers

References

External links
 

1986 births
Living people
South African cricketers
Boland cricketers
People from Robertson, Western Cape
Cricketers from the Western Cape